Alcázar Basket, also known as Seguros Soliss Alcázar Basket by sponsorship reasons, was a basketball club based in Alcázar de San Juan, Castile-La Mancha.

History
Alcázar Basket was founded in 2013 with the aim to be the main basketball club of the city after the dissolution of Fundación Adepal, who played one season in the second tier.

After three seasons in Liga EBA, the club achieves the promotion to LEB Plata in the 2015–16 season after winning the play-off stage played in Plasencia.

On 17 July 2017, just after finishing their first season in LEB Plata, the club announced it would be dissolved due to the lack of support. The board of directors alleged that in that situation, the project is left over.

Sponsorship naming
Seguros Soliss Alcázar Basket 2013–2017

Season by season

References

External links

2013 establishments in Castilla–La Mancha
2017 disestablishments in Castilla–La Mancha
Basketball teams in Castilla–La Mancha
Basketball teams established in 2013
Basketball teams disestablished in 2017
Former Liga EBA teams
Former LEB Plata teams
Alcázar de San Juan